The U.S. Fund for UNICEF, doing business as UNICEF USA, is a non-profit, non-governmental organization (NGO) in the United States that supports the United Nations Children's Fund (UNICEF). Founded in 1947 by Helenka Pantaleoni, it is the oldest of the 36 UNICEF National Committees that support UNICEF worldwide through fundraising, advocacy and education. Since its inception, the U.S. Fund has provided UNICEF and various NGOs with $6.3 billion in cash and gifts-in-kind.

Campaigns

UNICEF USA administers the long-running Trick-or-Treat for UNICEF campaign, which began as a local fundraising event in Pennsylvania in 1950 and has since raised more than US$170 million to support UNICEF's work. The U.S. Fund also sponsored the UNICEF Tap Project, which provided children around the world with access to safe, clean water. The Tap Project began in 2007 and ended in 2016.

Leadership
The President and CEO of UNICEF USA is Michael J. Nyenhuis. Current members of the National Board of Directors are Andrew D. Beer, Robert T. Brown, Daniel J. Brutto, Nelson Chai, Gary M. Cohen, Mary Callahan Erdoes, Pamela Fiori, Dolores Rice Gahan, Sarah Godlewski, Mindy Grossman, Hilary Gumbel, Vincent John Hemmer, John A. Herrmann Jr., Franklin Hobbs, Peter Lamm (Chair), Barrie Landry, Téa Leoni, Bob Manoukian, Dikembe Mutombo, Anthony Pantaleoni, Henry Schleiff, Caryl M. Stern, Bernard Taylor, and Sherrie Rollins Westin.

Headquarters and offices
The U.S. Fund for UNICEF is headquartered in Manhattan in New York City and maintains regional offices in Atlanta, Boston, Chicago, Dallas, Houston, Los Angeles, San Francisco and Washington, D.C.

Finances
UNICEF USA carries Charity Navigator's 3-Star (Good) financial standards rating for charities. Out of every dollar spent, 89 cents goes toward helping children, 8 cents is spent on fundraising costs, and 3 cents on administration.

Cards and gifts

The first UNICEF greeting card was created in 1949, the design featuring a "thank you picture" by a seven-year-old girl whose village in Czechoslovakia received emergency assistance from UNICEF. The card launched a worldwide fundraising activity that continues to provide a significant source of revenue to UNICEF. The U.S. Fund makes UNICEF greeting cards and gifts available in the United States through the UNICEF Market website.

The U.S. Fund also supports UNICEF with UNICEF Inspired Gifts. Through this program, individuals can purchase lifesaving supplies for children such as therapeutic milk or anti-malarial mosquito nets and have them shipped to one of the over 150 countries and territories in which UNICEF works.

UNICEF Ambassadors
UNICEF USA has a long history of support from its celebrity ambassadors and high-profile supporters who play a significant role in promoting UNICEF and advocating and fundraising on its behalf. Current UNICEF USA Ambassadors include Katy Perry, Laurence Fishburne, Selena Gomez, Dayle Haddon, Angie Harmon, Téa Leoni, Lucy Liu, Joel Madden, Alyssa Milano, Sarah Jessica Parker, Marcus Samuelsson, Tyson Chandler and Vern Yip.

References

External links
 
 UNICEF USA FAQ
 Trick-or-Treat for UNICEF
 UNICEF Market
 UNICEF Inspired Gifts
 U.S. Fund for UNICEF rating by Charity Navigator

Children's charities based in the United States
UNICEF